Serenada  is a 1968 Soviet short film directed by Qarltos  Khotivari.

Plot  
Storekeeper Zozo and worker Intermediate Ramaz throughout the film are a desperate struggle for the heart timekeeper Lali. In this struggle, there is no room for sentimentality. Everything is decided by brute male force.

Cast 
Lali Habazashvili as Lali
Ramaz Giorgobiani as Ramaz
Zozo Bakradze as Zozo Avtandilych, storekeeper
 Baadur Tsuladze as warehouse worker, Avtandilych's friend 
Vakhtang Kukhianidze
Nino Dumbadze
Tengiz Malania

Awards
Are two awards —  for best director and the prize of the Union of Cinematographers —  at the III All-Union festival of television films (1969, Leningrad)

References

External links
 Serenada on the Internet Movie Database
 Serenada on the YouTube

1968 films
Soviet comedy films
Films based on works by Mikhail Zoshchenko
Soviet short films
Soviet black-and-white films
Soviet television films
Georgian-language films
Soviet-era films from Georgia (country)
1968 comedy films
Black-and-white films from Georgia (country)
Comedy films from Georgia (country)
1968 short films
Short films from Georgia (country)
1968 television films